Agim Hushi (born 1 May 1967) is an World class Albanian-born, Australian-naturalized spinto tenor currently living and working in Vienna, Austria.

Life
After his university studies for literature and psychology in Tirana, Hushi was noted for his tenor voice. He studied at the Albanian Academy of Arts in Tirana from which he graduated in 1991.

From 1991-1992 he was principal tenor with the Albanian State Opera, where he performed in Tosca, Cavalleria Rusticana and Il Trovatore. From 1992-1995 he continued his postgraduate studies at the Franz Liszt Academy of Music in Budapest where, in  parallel with vocal studies, he specialized in pedagogy of singing.

In 1995 he was appointed principal tenor at the Hungarian State Opera where he performed  major roles ranging in operas including Manon Lescout, Turandot, Il Tabarro, Il Lombardi and Purgacov.

In 1997, he moved to Australia after having been invited to perform the role of Des Grieux in Puccini's Manon Lescaut, for the South Australian State Opera in Adelaide under the baton of maestro Richard Bonynge who was noted as saying: "In my entire experience working with Agim Hushi has been a wonderful discovery. Agim Hushi and Laura Niculescu are the best cast in the world today".

He then sang in the same opera for Opera Australia. Some critics compared him to the legendary tenor Beniamino Gigli.

Hushi continued to sing around Asia, New Zealand and USA. 
In 1999 with an Australian government grant he went for a belcanto experience in Milan with Franco Corelli, who wrote of him: "Agim Hushi's voice is strong and beautiful and he deserve an International career".

Hushi has performed in Australia, New Zealand, China, The United States, Malaysia, Singapore, Brunei, Dubai, Hungary, Germany, Russia, Slovenia, Macedonia, Kosovo, Croatia, Czech Republic, Romania, Bulgaria, France, Greece, Cyprus, Denmark, Italy, Spain, UK, Switzerland, Albania and Austria.

His primary roles are those of Cavaradosi, Calaf, Des Grieux, Radames, Manrico, Luigi, Canio and Turiddu.

In 2010 Hushi recorded with Albanian soprano Inva Mula for EMI her new CD, Il Bel Sogno with operatic arias supported by Zagreb Philharmonic Orchestra.
In October 2012 Hushi recorded his first solo album, Amore Grande, with the most famous tenor songs under the baton of A. Pavlic and the New Europe Symphonic Orchestra.
This CD was regarded from Deutsche Grammophon and critics as one of the best CD since Di Stefanos best days in all tenors recordings.

Hushi is currently the Head of the Opera Department at the Vienna Conservatorium. He was a founder of Belcanto School of Singing in Adelaide, Australia.

Career highlights

Cavaradosi from Tosca, Kuala Lumpur, Malaysia. August 2004
Cavaradosi from Tosca, Singapore Lyric Opera September–October 2004
Calaf from Turandot, Albanian National Opera of Tirana May–June 2005
Manrico from Opera Trovatore, XV International Festival of Opera, Russia December 2005
July 2005 concerts recitals, Greece-Athens
September 2005, Prishtina Kosovo
July 2005 Macedonia, Festival of Ohrid
April 2006 recital, Albanian National Opera of Tirana
October- November 2006 Cavaradosi from opera Tosca, Albanian National Opera
July–August 2007 Radames from Aida in Tirana Albanian National Opera
September 2007 Recital in Vienna
October 2007 Recital in Old Fellow Palace Copenhage, Danimark
November Turiddu from Cavalleria Rusticana in Bulgaria
December Recital Christmas Concert in Copenhagen
December 2007 Recital in Sophia, Bulgaria with Sophia Philharmonic Orchestra
December 2007 Recital in Stara Zagora Opera in Bulgaria
March–April 2008 singing Manrico from Il Trovatore in Albanian National Opera
April concert Recital in Nicosia, Cyprus
June Concert Recital with National Opera Orchestra in Albania
July Concert, Festival “The tone on the stone” Forlie, Italy Symphonic Orchestra of Bologna
August 2008 singing Radames from opera Aida in open air
November Concert Recital in London, UK
April  Concert in Budapest
September Concert Recital in Monte Carlo
January Concert Recital in Macau
February Concert Recital in Hong Kong
May  Concert Recital in Shanghai
September, Concert Vienna State Opera, Tenor Guest in Memorial of Mario Del Monaco
26 May 2012 Concert Recital Qingdao with Philharmonic Orchestra
6 July Concert Recital Agim Hushi and friends with Philharmonic Orchestra of Albanian National TV in Kavajë, Albania
7–12 October recording with New Europe Symphony Orchestra famous tenor songs for his new Album CD, *Amore Grande*, Sofia, Bulgaria
10 July till 15 September 2013, concert tour, recitals in China

Awards
 September 1999 - winner of the "Jane Potter Foundation" in Australia for his achievement in opera and for his high class performances on world opera stages.
 April 2000 - awarded the "Emerging Artist of the Year 2000" from the Premier of Australia.
 June 2005 - awarded the Golden Medal of UN by Waheed Waheedullah, the Ambassador of the United Nations in Albania
 March 29, 2012 - awarded the Golden Medal, Great Master of Arts, by the Albanian president.
 May 26, 2012 - received the title of "Professor" from Qingdao Technological University, P.R.C.
 June 20, 2012 - awarded the title of Honorary Citizen at his native city of Kavajë.

References

External links 
 Official Website

Living people
21st-century Albanian male opera singers
Tenors from Kavajë
1964 births